Tom Coyne may refer to:

 Tom Coyne (writer), American writer and professor
 Tom Coyne (broadcaster) (1930–2015), British news broadcaster and television presenter
 Tom Coyne (music engineer) (1954–2017), American mastering engineer
 Tommy Coyne (born 1962), Republic of Ireland footballer
 Thomas Coyne (cricketer) (1873–1955), Australian cricketer